Friedrich Wilhelm Adam Sertürner (19 June 1783 – 20 February 1841) was a German pharmacist and a pioneer of alkaloid chemistry. He is best known for his discovery of morphine in 1804.

Biography
Friedrich Wilhelm Adam Sertürner was born to Joseph Simon Serdinner and Marie Therese Brockmann on 19 June 1783, in Neuhaus, North Rhine-Westphalia (now part of Paderborn). After his parents died, he became a pharmacist's apprentice in Paderborn.

Sertürner was the first to isolate morphine from opium. He called the isolated alkaloid "morphium" after the Greek god of dreams, Morpheus.  He published a comprehensive paper on its isolation, crystallization, crystal structure, and pharmacological properties, which he studied first in stray dogs and then in self-experiments.  Morphine was not only the first alkaloid to be extracted from opium, but the first ever alkaloid to be isolated from any plant.  Thus Sertürner became the first person to isolate the active ingredient associated with a medicinal plant or herb.
The branch of science that he originated has since become known as alkaloid chemistry.

In 1806 Sertürner moved to Einbeck, working as a pharmacists' assistant. In 1809, Sertürner opened the first  pharmacy he owned, in Einbeck. He continued to investigate the effects of morphine. After the publication of his paper  "Ueber das Morphium als Hauptbestandteil des Opiums" in 1817, his work on morphine became more widely known and morphine became more widely used.
In 1822, Sertürner bought the main pharmacy in Hamelin (Rathaus Apotheke), where he worked until his death on
20 February 1841. He was buried in Einbeck.

Isolation of morphine
During his efforts to isolate morphine from opium between 1804 and 1816, Sertürner relied on animal and human testing to evaluate the results of his work. His 1806 paper describes a highly impure alcoholic extract of opium that was tested on a mouse and three dogs, one of which died as a result.

As described in his 1817 paper, he finally found success extracting colourless crystals of pure morphine by precipitation. He dissolved the crystals in alcohol and tested the effects of this solution by swallowing it together with 3 boys, “none older than seventeen years.” He administered it gradually, in three doses of half-grains. After the third dose, symptoms of intoxication increased to an almost fatal extent. Concerned by this result, Sertürner drank several ounces of vinegar along with the boys, inducing extreme vomiting. He was not fully conscious while responding to the situation:

Sertürner hypothesized that, because lower doses of the drug were needed, it would be less addictive. However, he became addicted to the drug, warning that "I consider it my duty to attract attention to the terrible effects of this new substance I called morphium in order that calamity may be averted."

Heinrich Emanuel Merck began the sale of morphine a few years after Sertürner's paper was published. Jean-Francois Derosne and Armand Séguin have both been claimed to have discovered morphine before Sertürner.

Recognition
In 1817 Sertürner was awarded an honorary doctorate from Jena University. In 1831, Sertürner received the Montyon Prize and the title ‘Benefactor of Humanity’.

References

Further reading

1783 births
1841 deaths
People from Paderborn
19th-century German chemists
German pharmacists
Morphine